The Stella is a 'one-design' Bermuda rig sloop yacht, designed for cruising and racing by the noted yacht designer CR (Kim) Holman in 1959.  The design was to the requirements of a customer who had seen the Nordic Folkboat and decided that the English east coast needed a similar vessel but modified for North Sea as opposed to Baltic conditions and a competitive racer on handicap.  The prototype: Stella No. 1 La Vie en Rose was built to win the 1959 Burnham (on Crouch) week, which she promptly did.  Clinker built of mahogany or larch on oak frames.

The restoration of Amulet, an amateur built yacht similar to a Stella originally built in Fort William in 1964, is described by Bob Orrell in the book Amulet: A Charm Restored and Sailed to the Western Isles.
This boat is not actually a Stella (this is evident from the book and photographs) and is not recognised by the Stella Class Association.

Fleets exist in the UK (estimated 100 built, mostly still extant) and Australia (approximately 20 built).

Key dimensions

 Length (LOA): 25' 10"
 Length on waterline: 20' 0")
 Beam: 7' 6" 
 Sail area: 338sq ft (main & genoa)  
 Draft: 3' 10"
 Weight: 2.7  Imp. tons
 Ballast: 1.22 Imp. tons

See also
Twister - another Holman yacht design (latterly produced in GRP), developed from that of the 'Stella'.

External links
Stella Class Association

References

Sailing yachts
1950s sailboat type designs